Events in the year 2017 in Cuba.

Incumbents
 First Secretary of the Communist Party of Cuba: Raúl Castro
 Second Secretary: José Ramón Machado Ventura
 President of the Council of State: Raúl Castro
 First Vice President: Miguel Díaz-Canel

Events

 29 September – US government order to cut diplomats staff member in Cuba Embassy, due a mysterious attack.

Deaths

7 January – Carlos Fernández Gondín, politician (b. 1938).
26 January – Mario Quintero, basketball player (b. 1924).

12 June – Fernando Martínez Heredia, politician (b. 1939)

26 November – Armando Hart, politician (b. 1930).

References

 
2010s in Cuba
Years of the 21st century in Cuba
Cuba
Cuba